Marcelle Lentz-Cornette (2 March 1927 – 29 January 2008) was a Luxembourgish politician for the Christian Social People's Party (CSV).  Outside politics, she was a schoolteacher.

Political career
Marcelle Lentz-Cornette was born in Niederkorn, in the southern commune of Differdange.  She entered the communal council of Sanem in 1968, and remained there until 1985, in addition to holding the position of échevin (1970–1980) in the commune's administration.  Lentz-Cornette was elected to the Chamber of Deputies in 1979.  She served only one term (until 1984), having become one of Luxembourg's six Members of the European Parliament (MEPs) in 1980, replacing Jean Spautz.  Lentz-Cornette sat in the European Parliament for two terms, including one full term, until 1989. During this time, she became friend with Otto von Habsburg and Simone Veil.

In that year, she joined the Parliamentary Assembly of the Council of Europe, of which she remained a member until 1999.  During one of her official mission in Latin America,  Manuel Noriega experienced her blunt and rather undiplomatic way of expressing her strong opinion on human rights and democracy.

She served two more spells in Sanem's communal council (1997–1999, 2001–2003), before retiring.

Beside this, Marcelle Lentz-Cornette dedicated time and personal money to improve health care conditions in Nicaragua.

Marcelle Lentz-Cornette is also recognized as one of the Luxembourg politicians to have encouraged, protected and pushed Jean-Claude Juncker in his political career from the beginning. In 2003, Lentz-Cornette remaining completely faithful to the USA since World War II and defended the war against Sadam Hussein and Iraq , though this was not in line with Juncker's cautious distance with the US offensive. From this episode, their long political connivance was damaged.

On September 28, 2013 Prime Minister Jean-Claude Juncker, her "son in politics" and the Mayor of Sanem launched a square in new city Belval named  Place Marcelle Lentz-Cornette.

Private life
Marcelle Lentz-Cornette was married to doctor Albert Lentz (1927–2017) . She is the aunt and godmother of Guy Lentz, coordinator for International and European Energy issues at the Government of Luxembourg.

Members of the Chamber of Deputies (Luxembourg)
Councillors in Sanem
Christian Social People's Party politicians
Luxembourgian educators
1927 births
2008 deaths
People from Differdange
Christian Social People's Party MEPs
20th-century women MEPs for Luxembourg
MEPs for Luxembourg 1979–1984
MEPs for Luxembourg 1984–1989
Commanders Crosses of the Order of Merit of the Federal Republic of Germany